Workers Power is the name of several political parties or organizations:

Workers' Power (Germany) (Arbeitermacht)
Workers Power (Ireland)
Workers' Power, Italian terrorist organization (1976-1983)
Workers' Power (Sweden)
Workers' Power (UK)
Workers Power (United States)

Political party disambiguation pages